Justine Pimlott is a Canadian documentary filmmaker, and co-founder of Red Queen Productions with Maya Gallus. She began her career apprenticing as a sound recordist with Studio D, the women’s studio at the National Film Board of Canada (NFB), in Montreal. As a

documentary filmmaker, her work has won numerous awards, including Best Social Issue Documentary at Hot Docs Canadian International Documentary Festival and Best Canadian Film at Inside Out Film and Video Festival for Laugh in the Dark, which critic Thomas Waugh described, in The Romance of Transgression in Canada as "one of the most effective and affecting elegies in Canadian queer cinema." Her films have screened internationally at Sheffield Doc/Fest, SEOUL International Women’s Film Festival, Women Make Waves (Taiwan), This Human World Film Festival (Vienna), Singapore International Film Festival, among others, and have been broadcast around the world.

She has also served as chair of the board and programmer for Inside Out, former board member for DOC Toronto, and, in 1982, founded Film Furies, the first international women’s film festival in Winnipeg.  In 2014, she returned to the NFB, as a producer with its Ontario Studio in Toronto. Her producorial credits with the NFB include a 2017 co-production with Intervention Productions, A Better Man.

Filmography
2000 - Laugh in the Dark (producer/director/writer)
2002 - Chasing the Dream (director)
2005 - Fag Hags: Women Who Love Gay Men (director)   
2007 - Girl Inside (producer)
2007 - Punch like a Girl (producer/co-director)
2008 - Cat City (director)
2010 - Dish: Women, Waitressing & the Art of Service (producer)
2012 - The Mystery of Mazo de la Roche (producer)
2013 - Derby Crazy Love (producer/co-director)
2017 - A Better Man (producer)
2020 - Inconvenient Indian (producer)

Awards and nominations

Hot Docs
2000: Best Social Issue Documentary: Laugh in the Dark (Award)

Inside Out Film and Video Festival
2000: Best Canadian Film: Laugh in the Dark (Award)

M. Joan Chalmers Documentarian Award – Ontario Arts Council
2000: Laugh in the Dark (Shortlisted)

For additional awards - see Red Queen Productions

References

External links
 
 
 

Canadian documentary film directors
Canadian women film directors
Canadian documentary film producers
Living people
National Film Board of Canada people
Canadian women film producers
Film festival founders
Year of birth missing (living people)
21st-century Canadian LGBT people
LGBT film directors
LGBT producers
Canadian women documentary filmmakers